Dermot O'Toole (22 November 1910 – 22 December 1970) was an Irish architect. His work was part of the architecture event in the art competition at the 1948 Summer Olympics.

References

1910 births
1970 deaths
20th-century Irish architects
Olympic competitors in art competitions
People from Maynooth